Pule Lechesa (born 1976) is a black South African essayist, literary critic, poet, and publisher. His published books include Four Free State Authors (2005), The Evolution of Free State Black Literature (2006), and, Omoseye Bolaji...on Awards, Authors, Literature (2007). Pule Lechesa is the founder and main editor of Phoenix Press Publishers (in Ladybrand), which continues to publish sundry fiction, poetry, short stories, and criticism. His latest published books are Essays on Free State Black Literature (2012), Bolaji in his Pomp (2013), and A penny for Lechesa's Thoughts (2016).

Also a competent African sports writer, Lechesa was one of the football journalists who attended a FIFA-sponsored training session that took place in Nairobi, Kenya, in March 2010. He has since left a South African daily newspaper called The New Age to become a copy editor at Free State's largest weekly title, Public Eye Newspaper. In 2015, Pule Lechesa published a monograph on distinguished Sesotho writer K. P. D. Maphalla. He is now the spokesperson for Mantsopa Municipality in South Africa.

References

Further reading
"PULE LECHESA"; Free State Libraries journal (April–June 2007 edition)
Interviews with Effervescent Writers (2012), edited by Christine Mautjana. Ladybrand and Lesotho: Mbali Press. (See pages 68 – 81 for an interview with Pule Lechesa)

External links

 "pule lechesa at the theatre", kagablog, 2 November 2006
 "Four Free State authors", WorldCat
 "Lechesa for Kenya", Freestatewriters, 4 March 2010
 "Pule Lechesa's "Essays on Free State Black Literature", Black African Literature, 28 January 2012
 "Lechesa Joins Outstanding African Literary Critics", Free State Books, 11 September 2013

 https://openlibrary.org/works/OL17358846W/A_PENNY_FOR_LECHESA'S_THOUGHTS

1976 births
Living people
South African literary critics
South African poets
South African publishers (people)